Jesse Agel (born September 24, 1961) is an American college basketball coach and was the head men's basketball coach at Brown University from 2008 to 2012. He is currently an assistant coach at Columbia. Previously, Agel was an assistant at NJIT. He is a native of New York City and a graduate of Stuyvesant High School.

Prior to Brown, Agel had a 17-year stint as an assistant coach at his alma mater, the University of Vermont.

Head coaching record

College

References

1961 births
Living people
Basketball coaches from New York (state)
Brown Bears men's basketball coaches
College men's basketball head coaches in the United States
Columbia Lions men's basketball coaches
High school basketball coaches in New York (state)
NJIT Highlanders men's basketball coaches
Sportspeople from New York City
University of Vermont alumni
Vermont Catamounts men's basketball coaches